The 2002 Virginia Tech Hokies football team represented the Virginia Tech in the 2002 NCAA Division I-A football season. The team's head coach was Frank Beamer.

Schedule

Rankings

Roster

Team players in the NFL

References

Virginia Tech
Virginia Tech Hokies football seasons
Redbox Bowl champion seasons
Virginia Tech Hokies football